Xiphocolaptes is a genus of bird in the Dendrocolaptinae subfamily.

Species
The genus contains four species:

References

External links

 
Bird genera
Taxa named by René Lesson
Taxonomy articles created by Polbot